The 1978 Sun Belt Conference men's basketball tournament was held February 24–26 at the Charlotte Coliseum in Charlotte, North Carolina.

 defeated  in the championship game, 22–20, to win their first Sun Belt men's basketball tournament.

However, no Sun Belt teams were invited to the 1978 NCAA tournament.

Format
All six of the conference's members participated in the tournament field. They were seeded based on regular season conference records with the top two teams earning byes to the semifinal round.

The tournament was played at the Charlotte Coliseum in Charlotte, North Carolina.

Bracket

References

Sun Belt Conference men's basketball tournament
Tournament
Sun Belt Conference men's basketball tournament
Sun Belt Conference men's basketball tournament